Faculty of Science is one of the eight faculties in University of Peradeniya. It was established as the second Faculty of Science in Sri Lanka in 1961.

Overview
Faculty of Science is situated about half a kilometre from the Galaha Junction, Peradeniya. Faculty consists of 110 academic and 120 non-academic staff.

Degree Programs
Faculty of Science offers course of study leading to General and Special Degrees of Bachelor of Science (B.Sc.). Course unit system is introduced in 2001. The calendar of the faculty is semester based. The new honors degree programme B.Sc. in Environmental Science (Honors) is established in 2016.

Departments and institutions
The faculty consists of nine departments, six units, a separate library and the Postgraduate Institute of Science (PGIS).
 Departments of the Faculty of Science

Department of Botany 
Department of Chemistry 
Department of Geology 
Department of Mathematics 
Department of Molecular Biology and Bio-technology 
Department of Physics 
Department of Statistics and Computer Science 
Department of Zoology 
Department of Environmental and Industrial Sciences

See also
University of Peradeniya

References

External links
Faculty of Science, University of Peradeniya official website

Science